The Kate Logan Affair is a 2010 Canadian drama film starring Alexis Bledel and Laurent Lucas, written and directed by Noël Mitrani about a young psychologically unstable police woman named Kate Logan and a married Frenchman who find themselves caught up in a dramatic twisted affair. Based on the true story of a 2002 crime committed by an Alberta policewoman.

Plot
Benoit Gando (Laurent Lucas) is a French insurance agent visiting a picturesque Northern Ontario town for a conference. He has a steady marriage with a nuclear engineer and an eleven-year-old daughter. Benoit is leaving a convenience store as twenty-seven-year-old rookie cop Kate Logan (Alexis Bledel) mistakes him for a suspected rapist. She explains the misunderstanding and lets him go, although it is possible she made up the story to get herself introduced to him, but the question arises how did she know who he was beforehand. Later that evening she shows up at his motel and offers him a drink in order to make up for the encounter. He accepts and due to her "innocent" flirtations they end up sleeping together.

In a subsequent encounter, Kate shows Benoit how to hold and aim her service pistol. While he playfully does this, never having handled one before, the pistol goes off and a bullet is lodged in the wall of the motel room. Fearing the loss of her job, Kate drags Benoit deeper into the affair and both are now on the run. Benoit just wants to go to the police and tell them the truth that it was just an accident. She keeps him hooked by threatening to tell his wife that they slept together. She tells him that they will come up with a better solution.

The outcome of the situation is tragic, for everyone but Kate. This woman manages to destroy many lives yet comes out of it unscathed. She murders Benoit and makes it look like self-defense and manages to avoid losing her job as a cop.

Cast
 Alexis Bledel ... as Kate Logan
 Laurent Lucas ... as Benoît Gando
 Noémie Godin Vigneau ... as Valérie Gando
 Serge Houde 
 Pierre-Luc Brillant 
 Ricky Mabe 
 Cory Fantie 
 Martin Thibaudeau
 Bruce Dinsmore
 Tarah Schwartz
 Kate Drummond

Festivals 
 Festival du Nouveau Cinéma 2010

References

External links 
 
  
   
 
  The Gazette Reviews
 Rookie Gone Rogue 
 The Kate Logan Affair Has Started Filming 
 Review at Orcasound.com

2010 films
English-language Canadian films
Canadian drama films
Films directed by Noël Mitrani
2010s English-language films
2010s Canadian films